Johl may refer to:

 Max G. Johl (1876-1935), an American philatelist of Connecticut
 Peter Johl who died November 3, 2005 after a long career on Broadway